Methyl gallate is a phenolic compound. It is the methyl ester of gallic acid.

Natural occurrences 
It is found in Terminalia myriocarpa, Bergenia ciliata (hairy Bergenia) and Geranium niveum.

It is found in the fruit extract of Paeonia anomala.

It is also found in wine.

See also 
 Phenolic content in wine

References 

Phenolic acids
Methyl esters